Reckless is a 1951 Spanish drama film directed by José Antonio Nieves Conde. It was entered into the 1951 Cannes Film Festival.

Plot 
Spanish missionary Javier Mendoza (Fernando Fernán Gómez) finds himself trapped in the middle of a massive snow storm in Alaska. Fearing that the end of his days has come, he begins to remember his life: After the death of his mother, his father (Javier Tordesillas) dedicates himself to gambling and Javier himself, known as Balarrasa, also leads a life rampant. Nor do the other siblings, Fernando (Luis Prendes), Lina (Dina Stern) and Maite (María Rosa Salgado) lead exemplary lives. When the Spanish Civil War breaks out, Mendoza incurs in an unheroic behavior that ends the life of a colleague by playing cards for a guard that does not belong to him. Impressed by the event, he enters the Seminary. After redirecting the existence of his relatives, he begins a new life as a missionary.

Cast
 Manolo Morán as Desiderio
 Jesús Tordesillas as Carlos
 Dina Sten as Lina
 Luis Prendes as Fernando
 José Bódalo as Presidente del club
 Maruchi Fresno as Elena
 María Rosa Salgado as Mayte
 Eduardo Fajardo as Mario
 Fernando Fernán Gómez as Javier Mendoza 'Balarrasa'
 Fernando Aguirre as Valentin
 Francisco Bernal as Emiliano
 Mario Berriatúa as Teniente Hernández
 Julia Caba Alba as Faustina
 Chano Conde as Teniente
 Alfonso de Córdoba as Alférez
 Gérard Tichy as Zanders

References

External links
 
 

1951 films
1950s Spanish-language films
1951 drama films
Spanish black-and-white films
Films directed by José Antonio Nieves Conde
Spanish drama films
1950s Spanish films